Strophius is a genus of crab spiders first described by Eugen von Keyserling in 1880.

Species
 it contains seven species:
Strophius albofasciatus Mello-Leitão, 1929 — Brazil
Strophius fidelis Mello-Leitão, 1929 — Brazil
Strophius hirsutus O. Pickard-Cambridge, 1891 — Costa Rica, Panama
Strophius levyi Soares, 1943 — Brazil
Strophius mendax Mello-Leitão, 1929 — Brazil
Strophius nigricans Keyserling, 1880 — Trinidad, Peru, Brazil, Paraguay
Strophius signatus O. Pickard-Cambridge, 1892 — Mexico, Guatemala, Brazil

References

External links

Araneomorphae genera
Thomisidae
Taxa named by Eugen von Keyserling